Storvik may refer to:

People
Kaia Storvik (born 1976), Norwegian journalist, former newspaper editor and politician
Kenneth Storvik (born 1972), Norwegian football midfielder
Kjell Storvik (born 1930), Norwegian economist and former Governor of the Central Bank of Norway

Places
Storvik, Sweden, a locality